Rajarethinam Arokiasamy Sundaram (RA Sundaram) was born on 10 June 1905 in Megathur of Valampuri of Thanjavur. He was ordained a priest 24 February 1941.  He was appointed as first Bishop of Thanjavur on 4 February 1953.  He served nearly 33 years as Bishop of Thanjavur. He died on 28 August 1998. Besides his pastoral works, the bishop's multidimensional approach on the promotion of education and socio-cultural economic measures benefited different sections of the society.

Early life 
Sundaram was first son of Rajarathinam and Lourdu Mary, in devout family of Valampuri, Thanjavur. He finished his school education in Thanjavur and Palayamkottai.  He joined St. Joseph's College, Thiruchirapalli for higher studies.

Priesthood 
After finishing his studies, Sundaram decided to work for a few years and then join the seminary. For a short period, he  taught English at the St. Xavier's college, Palayamkottai. He got an offer to work as a professor of physics at St. Joseph's College, Darjeeling. After three years, Sundaram joined the minor seminary at Santhome. Sundaram joined the Urban College in Rome to enable his ordination in six years. He was an outstanding seminarian there at Urban college and a member of the literary association, editing and publishing newsletters and compering programs in the Radio Vatican.

Sundaram was ordained as priest in 1941. Fr. Sundaram celebrated his first two mass in the St. Paul's Cathedral and St. Peter's Basilica in Rome.

Bishop of Thanjavur 
Fr. Sundaram was appointed as assistant Parish Priest at Vallam, Thanjavur.  Fr. Sundaram was appointed as Headmaster of Santhome High School, Mylapore. His efforts brings this school as one of the best school in the city, within a short period. 
 
The Diocese of Thanjavur was created on 22 November 1952 and Fr. Sundaram was assumed charge in 1953 as First Bishop of Thanjavur.
He formed two social service societies at Thanjavur and Pudukkottai that helped uplift the status of the poor . Some of their schemes had been unique and innovative and one among them was providing lands to the landless. Because of his efforts, there is phenomenal increase in the number of educational, religious and social welfare institutions in and around Thanjavur. Even today, the diocese of Thanjavur has the highest number of boarding homes for students in India.

Our Lady of Health Hospital
Our Lady of Health Hospital was the out come of the ardent desire of Fr. Sundaram to render medical help to the sick and the needy 
people of Thanjavur. Because of Fr. Sundaram's efforts, On 4 April 1961 the hospital was opened by Mrs. Lourdammal Simon Minister 
of for Local administrative of Tamil Nadu with 16 beds and 3 sisters. Currently this hospital have 200 beds in these half of beds 
for free of cost. This hospital having multiple wards like Medical Ward, Surgical Ward, Maternity Ward, Pediatric Ward, 
Gynecology Ward, Ophthalmology Ward, Operation Theater, Casualty and Emergency unit and Out Patient department.

References

1905 births
1998 deaths
20th-century Roman Catholic bishops in India